Thomas Borenitsch (born 19 December 1980) is an Austrian football goalkeeper currently playing for Austrian Football Bundesliga side SV Mattersburg.

References

1980 births
Living people
People from Mattersburg District
Austrian footballers
SV Mattersburg players
Austrian Football Bundesliga players
Association football goalkeepers
Footballers from Burgenland